Ji-woo, also spelled Ji-u, or Ji-oo, is a Korean unisex given name. The meaning differs based on the hanja used to write each syllable of the name. There are 61 hanja with the reading "ji" and 60 hanja with the reading "woo" on the South Korean government's official list of hanja which may be registered for use in given names. In 2008, Ji-woo was the eighth-most popular name for newborn girls in South Korea, with 2,107 being given the name; it rose to fifth place in 2011, and subsequently to third place in 2013 and 2015.

People
People with this name include:
Hwang Ji-u (born 1952), South Korean male poet
Jung Ji-woo (born 1968), South Korean male film director
Choi Ji-woo (born Choi Mi-hyang, 1975), South Korean actress
Park Ji-woo (born 1980), South Korean male dancer
Kim Ji-woo (born Kim Jeong-eun, 1983), South Korean actress
Ji Woo (born Choi Ji-woo, 1997), South Korean actress
Park Ji-woo (speed skater) (born 1998), South Korean female speed skater
Chuu (singer) (born Kim Ji-woo, 1999), South Korean female singer,  former member of girl group Loona

Fictional characters
Fictional characters with this name include:

Ji-woo, male character in 2010 South Korean television series The Fugitive: Plan B
Hwang Ji-woo, male character in 2020 South Korean television series Men Are Men

See also
List of Korean given names

References

Korean unisex given names